The Thrill of It All is the second studio album by English singer and songwriter Sam Smith. It was released on 3 November 2017 through Capitol Records.

Background
On 6 October 2017, Smith announced via Twitter that their second album, titled "The Thrill of It All", was to be released on 3 November 2017. It is Smith's second full album of material after their hugely successful debut album In the Lonely Hour (2014), which has sold 12 million copies worldwide.

Speaking to Billboard about the album, Smith said:

Singles
"Too Good at Goodbyes" was released as the album's lead single on 8 September 2017. It topped the UK Singles Chart and peaked No. 4 on the US Billboard Hot 100.

"One Last Song" was sent to radio in the United Kingdom on 3 November 2017, on the day of album release as its second single.

On 27 March 2018, Smith announced that "Pray" would serve as the third single, and would feature newly recorded guest vocals from American rapper Logic. The song was released on 29 March 2018.

"Baby, You Make Me Crazy" was released as the fourth single from the album on 29 June 2018.

Promotional singles
On 6 October 2017, Smith released "Pray", a gospel-tinged ballad in collaboration with Timbaland, prompted by time spent in Iraq with the charity War Child as a promotional single from the album. Another promotional single, "Burning", was released on 27 October 2017.

Tour
Within releasing "Pray" as the promotional single on 6 October 2017, The Thrill of It All Tour was announced firstly revealing shows in Europe and North America. It began on 20 March 2018 in Sheffield, England, and concluded on 18 April 2019 in Cape Town, South Africa. In December 2018, Billboard concluded that after 94 shows, Smith grossed $86.1 million and sold 1.07 million tickets on The Thrill of It All Tour. It pushed their career total gross to $102.7 million from 1.4 million tickets sold.

Critical reception

The Thrill of It All received generally positive reviews from music critics. On Metacritic, which assigns a normalised rating out of 100 to reviews from mainstream publications, the album received an average score of 72 based on 16 reviews.

Neil McCormick of The Daily Telegraph gave the album four stars, and was highly positive about it and Smith's vocals, calling them "supernatural" and saying: "The Thrill of It All doesn't just wallow in love's misery, it practically drowns in the stuff. There's not much poetry in lines such as 'real love is never a waste of time' or 'there's no insurance to pay for the damage'. Yet it all hits home, because Smith makes every note sound like a matter of life and death. 'Him' is the album's centrepiece, a gospel drama addressed to a judgmental 'father', insisting on Smith's right to love whom  chooses. It is a kind of hymn to Him, and as the choir powers up it gains a righteous glory." Andy Gill from The Independent also gave a four-star review, and shared in the positivity about the album, remarking: "Smith's voice remains a thing of wonder throughout".

Will Hermes for Rolling Stone also gave a positive four-star review, and said: "Doubling down on his magnificent, gender-nonconforming voice while pushing his songcraft forward, Smith's second LP knights one of the mightiest, most expressive vocalists of his generation." In another positive review Nick Levine from NME compared Smith to Adele in his review of the album, stating: "Both have become enormously successful by singing emotional ballads that connect with huge numbers of people, and both are understandably reluctant to raise the tempo as a result. But like Adele's 25, this is an undeniably accomplished album that will, deservedly, shift a helluva lot of copies. AllMusic's Andy Kellman was positive too in his three and a half-star review, and opined: "this album maintains a consistency and intensity that places it slightly above the debut."

Some reviews were more negative. Though making it his album of the week and giving it three stars, Alexis Petridis from The Guardian was more mixed in his review, writing: "There's a certain power to "The Thrill of It All" but it could have been a much more potent album if they'd laid off the polish just a little." Kitty Empire from The Observer was less enthusiastic in a more negative two-star review, claiming Smith was "moping by numbers" like Adele, and surmised: "There is little drama here, just plenty of shorthand (sad pianos), a total absence of risk".

Accolades

Commercial performance
The Thrill of It All topped the UK Albums Chart in its first week of release with 97,328 combined units (consisting of 83,637 sales and 13,691 sales-equivalent streams), giving Smith their second number-one album in the nation after In the Lonely Hour (2014). It also had the fifth-largest opening there at the time for a 2017 album. The record fell to number two the next week with a combined total of 52,781 units. before returning to the top spot three weeks later and being displaced by Ed Sheeran's ÷ the following week. In Australia, the album opened at number two on the ARIA Albums Chart, becoming the singer's second album to enter at that position after In the Lonely Hour. It additionally debuted at number one on the Irish and Scottish charts.

The album debuted at number one on the US Billboard 200 with 237,000 album-equivalent units, including 185,000 pure sales, giving Smith their first chart-topper and highest opening sales in the United States. It also had the country's seventh-largest album opening of the year at the time. The Thrill of It All dropped to number two the following week, earning 66,000 album-equivalent units. It also became their first number one on the Canadian Albums Chart, debuting with 16,000 units, including 9,500 copies.

Track listing

Notes
 signifies an additional producer
Track 6, "Him", is stylised as "HIM".

Personnel
Credits adapted from album's liner notes.

 Vicky Akintola – backing vocals 
 Simon Aldred – electric guitar 
 Tom Archer – assistant engineer 
 Ian Burdge – string leader 
 Cam – electric guitar and backing vocals 
 The Dap-Kings – horns 
 Henri Davies – assistant engineer 
 Larrance "Rance" Dopson – piano 
 Steve Fitzmaurice – producer , additional production , engineer , mixing , additional drum programming , percussion 
 Richard George – string leader 
 Isabel Grundy Gracefield – assistant engineer 
 Nathanael Graham – assistant engineer 
 Brendan Grieve – producer , engineer , programming and celeste , drum programming , electric guitars 
 Simon Hale – string arrangement and conducting 
 Earl Harvin – drums , percussion , tambourine , additional drums , additional percussion , additional drum programming 
 Emile Haynie – producer, programming, drums, percussion, and piano 
 Darren Heelis – engineer , drum programming , additional drum programming , additional Moog , additional bass guitar 
 Reuben James – piano , Rhodes , Wurlitzer , organ 
 Lawrence Johnson – additional choir vocal arrangements 
 Tyler Johnson – producer ; programming, drum loops, bass guitar, and electric guitar ; piano and Moog 
 Ben Jones – guitars , acoustic guitar , electric guitars , additional guitars 
 The LJ Singers – choir 
 Patrick Linton – backing vocals 
 Nick Lobel – engineer 
 Bob Ludwig – mastering 
 Malay – producer, engineer, bass, and guitars ; programming and keyboards 
 Vula Malinga – backing vocals 
 Steph Marziano – assistant engineer 
 Tommy McLaughlin – assistant engineer 
 Jodi Milliner – bass , Moog bass , additional drum programming 
 Jimmy Napes – producer , drums and organ , original percussion , drum programming , additional drum programming , piano , Middle 8 piano , organ , synth pads 
 Everton Nelson – string leader 
 Darryl Pearson – guitar 
 LaDonna Harley Peters – backing vocals 
 Gus Pirelli – engineer , Moog bass 
 John Prestage – assistant engineer 
 Will Purton – assistant engineer , additional drum programming 
 Sam Smith – lead vocals , backing vocals 
 Stargate – producers and original percussion 
 Timbaland – producer, drum programming, percussion, 808 bass, and synth pads 
 Lucy Whalley – string contractor 
 Bruce White – string leader 
 Yebba – featured vocals

Charts

Weekly charts

Year-end charts

Decade-end charts

Certifications

Release history

References

2017 albums
Albums produced by Emile Haynie
Albums produced by Malay (record producer)
Albums produced by Stargate
Albums produced by Timbaland
Capitol Records albums
Sam Smith (singer) albums